Grimontia indica is a Gram-negative, rod-shaped and facultative aerobic bacterium species from the genus of Grimontia which has been isolated from Seawater from the southeast coast of the Palk Bay.

References 

Vibrionales
Bacteria described in 2014